Platynota calidana is a species of moth of the family Tortricidae. It is found on Cuba and in Florida in the United States.

The wingspan is about 15 mm.

References

Moths described in 1877
Platynota (moth)